The 1974 NCAA Division III Outdoor Track and Field Championships, were the first year the Division II/III designation was recognized in NCAA track and field. Previously, it was called the College Division. The top 6 athletes scored in their perspective event.

Results

100 Yard Dash

The event was wind aided. The 100 yd dash which is slightly shorter than a 100 meters, is 91.44 meters. All races at the time where hand timed.

220 Yard Dash

440 yard Dash

880 yard Run

One Mile Run

Three Mile Run

120 Yard Hurdles

440 Yard Hurdles

3000 Meter Steeplechase

High Jump

Pole Vault

Long Jump

Triple Jump

Shot Put

Discus Throw

Hammer Throw

Javelin Throw
The Javelin thrown in 1973 was different from the current model. Therefore, results cannot be directly compared to today's results.

Decathlon

440 Yard Relay

Mile Relay

References

External links
NCAA Division III men's outdoor track and field

1974
 Outdoor
Track Outdoor Men
NCAA Division III Outdoor Track and Field Championships